( or ) is a traditional dish in Portuguese cuisine. The name of the dish is literally translated as "Little fishes from the garden", as it resembles small pieces of colorful fish. It was introduced to Japan by Portuguese sailors  Antonio da Mota, Francisco Zeimoto and Antonio Peixoto in the sixteenth century, where it was eventually developed into tempura. In 1543, or later, by the Portuguese missionaries that came to them during the 16th century. The peixinhos da horta (green beans) gave rise to tempura, a typical Japanese dish.

Preparation
Peixinhos da horta is usually prepared with green beans in a wheat flour based batter that are then deep-fried. Other vegetables such as bell peppers and squash are also used.

References

Portuguese cuisine
Deep fried foods